Tappeh Bur (also Romanized as Tappeh Būr) is a village in Karaftu Rural District, in the Central District of Takab County, West Azerbaijan Province, Iran. At the 2006 census, its population was 328, in 64 families.

References 

Populated places in Takab County